The 2021–22 season was Dhaka Abahani's 50th season since its establishment in 1972 and their 14th consecutive season in the Bangladesh Premier League since initiation of the league. The season covered period were from 1 October 2021–31 July 2022.

Season summary

November
On 21 November 2021 the club has signed with Iranian forward Milad Sheykh Soleimani from Sepidrood Rasht S.C. for upcoming season.

On 29 November Dhaka Abahani played first match of this season. They have managed win by 2–1 goals against new promoted Swadhinata KS. Two goals by Brazilian midfielder Raphael Augusto and  midfielder Mehedi Hasan Royal.

December
On 7 December Dhaka Abahani defeated 3–1 goals Rahmatganj MFS. On 14 minutes own goal by Dhaka Abahani Tutul Hossain Badsha took lead Rahmatganj MFS but after 4 minutes Brazilian forward Dorielton equalized score. In the second half on 50 minutes penalty goal by Raphael Augusto and 70 minutes penalty goal by Dorielton made scored 3–1

On 10 December Dhaka Abahani thrashed Bangladesh Army football team by 4-0 goals. Costa Rican forward Daniel Colindres opened his account for Dhaka Abahani very last minutes of first half 45 minutes and his second on 70 minutes. Nabib Newaj Jibon on 67 minutes and Emon Mahmud Babu on 76 minutes goals gave Abahani big win also through to the Semi-finals.

On 14 December Dhaka Abahani defeated by 2–0 goals Saif Sporting Club. On 25 minutes Nabib Newaj Jibon goal took lead 1–0 lead they have finished first half. In the second half 81 minutes Costa Rican forward Daniel Colindres goal made score 2–0 secured victory. Dhaka Abahani through to the Final.

On 18 December Dhaka Abahani defeated by 3–0 goals Bashundhara Kings. First half of the match were goalless, in the second half 53 minutes goal by Rakib Hossain Abahani took lead. In the 67, 72 minutes two goals by Brazilian forward Dorielton Abahani crowned their titles after 1991.

On 25 December 2021 Dhaka Abahani won by 3–0 Walkover laws. The match were scheduled to play against Uttar Baridhara Club but Uttar Baridhara Club withdrew their name from the tournament.

On 29 December Dhaka Abahanindraw 2–2 goals against Sheikh Russel KC. In the First half on 8 minutes goal by Dorielton took lead Dhaka Abahani but after 12 minutes Mannaf Rabbi level the score for Sheikh Russel KC. In the second half again Dhaka Abahani took lead on 61 minutes second goal of Dorielton. In the 84 minutes Ailton Machado goal level the score 2–2 and end the match with draw. But due to withdrawn Uttar Baridhara Club participation in the tournament both teams' points were equal and referee were used penalties shoot out to decided group champion which Sheikh Russel KC won 13–12.

January
On 3 January Dhaka Abahani won 6–0 goals against Sheikh Jamal DC. In the first half on 22 minutes goal by Dorielton and 35 Raphael Augusto took lead Abahani and go to half time break. In the second half on 62 Dorielton made it 3–0. In the 70 minutes Daniel Colindres found the net. Nabib Newaj Jibon on 81 and 90+1 minutes double Dhaka Abahai thrashed Sheikh Jamal DC 6–0.

On 6 January Dhaka Abahani won 3(3)–3(4) penalties shoot out against Saif Sporting Club. On 10 minutes first half Raphael Augusto gave lead Dhaka  Abahani but Mfon Udoh equalized score on 19 minutes and finished half time 1–1. In the second half 74 minutes Emeka Ogbugh made score 2–1 until 90 minutes and Saif about to through the final but on 90+3 minutes Daniel Colindres goal level the score 2–2. In the extra time 90+4 minutes Rakib Hossain goal again Abahani took lead but on 120+3 minutes Saif SC Sazzad Hossain draw the scoreline 3–3. In the penalties shoot out Dhaka Abahani won 4–3 and through to the Final.

On 9 January Dhaka Abahani won 2–1 goals against Rahmatganj MFS in the final match of Federation Cup Bangladesh. In the first half both clubs play excellent but they wouldn't get goals until scored Dainiel Colindres on 45+1 minutes. In the second half Rakib Hossain extended the score 2–0. On 70 minutes Philip Adjah goal made scoreline 2–1 and Rahmatganj MFS finished their tournament journey will runner up trophy and Dhaka Abahani grabbed 12th Federation Cup trophy.

February
On 4 February Dhaka Abahani has meet versus Muktijoddha Sangsad KC in their home match and won by 1–0 goal. In the first half on 12 minutes Brazilian forward Dorielton goals got lead played first half 1–0 goal lead. In the second half both teams are played goalless and Dhaka Abahani got three points.

On 8 February Dhaka Abahani drawn 1–1 goals away match against Bangladesh Police FC. In the first half time both teams played excellent and competitive football and until half time score 0–0 goal. In the second half on 76 minutes a goal by Danilo Quipapá Bangladesh Police FC got lead 1–0 until addition time scored by  Dhaka Abahani on (90+3) minutes Dorielton match finished with a 1–1 goals drawn.

On 13 February Dhaka Abahani defeated Rahmatganj MFS by 3–0  goals at home. In the first half on 40, 43 and 45+1 minutes hat trick goals by Dorielton took lead with 3–0. In the second half Rahamtganj MFS tried to fought back but Dhaka Abahani players kept them in check to avoid any score. Dhaka Abahani left the field with full three points.

On 18 February Dhaka Abahai defeated 3–1 goals Sheikh Russel KC in the away match. In the first halftime both teams has played goalless. In the second half on 49 minutes Jewel Rana open account for Dhaka Abahani and second goals on 61 minutes by Milad Sheykh Soleimani made score 2–0. On 64 minutes goal by Esmaël Gonçalves made score 2–1 and Nabib Newaj Jibon goal on 84 minutes Dhaka Abahani secured win the game.

On 23 February Dhaka Abahani defeated by 1–0 goal Dhaka Mohammedan at home match. In the first half on 28 minutes Sohel Rana goal took lead Dhaka Abahni and finished halftime with score 1–0. In the second half Dhaka Mohammedan tried to score goal to avoid lost the Dhaka Derby match of the season but they won't able to do it. Dhaka Abahai got victory against their rivery Dhaka Mohammedan 1–0 goal and they got place on top of BPL.

March
On 1 March Dhaka Abahani lost to Chittagong Abahani by 2–3 goals at home venue. On 16 minutes Daniel Colindres goal took lead Dhaka Abahani 1–0 goal but after 4 minutes Chittagong Abahani Nigerian midfielder Peter Ebimobowei leveled the score 1–1 but on 37 minutes South African forward William Twala goal got lead Chittagong Abahani 2–1 goals and finished first half. In the second half on 64 minutes Afghanistan midfielder Omid Popalzay goals Chittagong make score 3–1 and they are about to win the game but on 89 Raphael Augusto goal reduced Dhaka Abahani defeat 2–3 goals.

On 6 March Dhaka Abahani defeated Saif Sporting Club by 2–1 goals at home venue.

On 11 March Dhaka Abahani drew to Swadhinata KS by 1–1 in the away match.

On 16 March Dhaka Abahani drew 0–0 against Sheikh Jamal DC in the away match.

April
On 3 April Dhaka Abahani drew against Bashundhara Kings by 2–2 at home ground. On 20 minutes Costarican forward Daniel Colindres goal got lead Dhaka Abahani 1–0 goal, meanwhile Bashundhara Kings players did not found the net in the first half. In the second half on 64 minutes Eleta Kingsley and Brazilian forward Robson goals got 2–1 goals advantage Bashundhara Kings but on 84 minutes Dorielton goal equalized score 2–2 goals both giants teams satisfied with share points.

On 7 April 2022 Dhaka Abahani have drew against Uttar Baridhara Club by 5–2 goals at home ground. In the very first minutes Daniel Colindres open goal account for Dhaka Abahani and after three minutes second goal for Dhaka Abahani by Nabib Newaj Jibon make it 2–0 but on 14 Minutes Papon Singh score for Uttar Baridhara Club. On 24 minutes Jewel Rana and again Daniel Colindres on 35 minutes converted score to 4–1 until first half break. On 61 minutes Dhaka Abahani Raphael Augusto make score 5–1 but on 68 minutes Uttar Baridhara Club midfielder Arif Hossain founded net they have reduced their defeat to 5–2 goals. In the 90+1 minutes Uttar Baridhara Club goalkeeper Mohammed Azad Hossen showed red card and sent off him.

On 12 April Dhaka Abahani scheduled to play against Club Valencia Maldives in their Preliminary round 2 match. But on 10 April Club Valencia withdrew their name due financial issue and they have sent their official statement to AFC that's they will not travel to Bangladesh. On 12 April AFC awarded Dhaka Abahani were winner of the match by Walkover laws 3–0 goals.

On 19 April Dhaka Abahani lost against ATK Mohun Bagan by 1–3 goals at Kolkata in the Play off match of AFC 2022.

On 29 April Dhaka Abahani beat Bangladesh Police FC by 2–1 goals at home stadium.

May
On 7 May Dhaka Abahani have won by 2–1 goals against Rahmatganj MFS in the away game.

On 12 May Dhaka Abahani have drew against Sheikh Russel KC by  1–1 at home.

June
On 22 June Dhaka Abahani have won against their rival club Dhaka Mohammedan by 4–2 goals in the away game.

On 28 June Dhaka Abahani have won versus port city club Chittagong Abahani by 3–2 goals in the opponent home ground.

July
On 19 July Dhaka Abahani have won against Sheikh Jamal DC by 5–0 goals at home game.

On 25 July Dhaka Abahani have lost to Bashundhara Kings by 2–3 goals in the opponent ground.

On 31 July Dhaka Abahani got victory against Uttar Baridhara Club by 5–2 goals in the away ground.

Transfer

In

Out

Pre-season and friendlies

Competitions

Overall

Overview

Independence Cup

Group stages

Group A

Knockout stage

Federation Cup

Group stages

Group B

Knockout stage

Premier League

League table

Results summary

Results by round

Matches

AFC Cup

Qualifying play-offs

Preliminary round 2

Play off round

Statistics

Goalscorers

Source: Matches

References

Abahani Limited Dhaka
Bangladeshi football club records and statistics
2021 in Bangladeshi football
2022 in Bangladeshi football